Křižanov is a market town in Žďár nad Sázavou District in the Vysočina Region of the Czech Republic. It has about 1,800 inhabitants.

Administrative parts
The village of Bojanov is an administrative part of Křižanov.

Notable people
Zdislava Berka (c. 1220–1252), saint

References

External links

 

Populated places in Žďár nad Sázavou District
Market towns in the Czech Republic